The following is a list of chancellors of the University of Cambridge from c.1215 to the present day. Chancellors were elected annually until 1514, and thereafter were elected for life.

See also
 List of Vice-Chancellors of the University of Cambridge
 List of Chancellors of the University of London
 List of Chancellors of the University of Oxford

References

Lists of people associated with the University of Cambridge
Cambridge